Caro Feely (born Caroline Marian Wardle 6 October 1968) is a South African-born Irish writer, Wine & Spirit Education Trust certified wine educator, winemaker and organic activist living in Saussignac, France.

Early life and education 

Caro grew up on a sugar farm in Kwa-Zulu Natal in South Africa. After high school at St. Anne's Diocesan College boarding school in Hilton, South Africa she completed a BCom at the University of KwaZulu Natal then Honours at the University of South Africa and a Masters in Economics at Rand Afrikaans University.

Career 

She met her husband Sean Feely, a journalist at the time, in Johannesburg. They lived and worked in Dublin for eight years before moving to France to set up an organic vineyard in 2005. Her first book Grape Expectations is about moving from Dublin city to France to go wine farming and converting to organic. 

The second book Saving Our Skins is about settling, converting to biodynamics, transforming the farm to an organic vineyard.  

In 2015 Summersdale published a wine book by Feely, Wine: The Essential Guide to Tasting, History, Culture and More.

In 2017 Summersdale published Feely's third book in the series about life on the organic vineyard: 'Glass Half Full' 
 

The vineyard owned and run with husband Sean, Chateau Feely, won the Best of Wine Tourism gold trophy for sustainable tourism in the Bordeaux region in 2013  under the original farm name 'Haut Garrigue', officially changed to the Family name SARL Chateau Feely on 20 June 2014  and for vineyard accommodation in 2017. Feely is the wine writer for Living magazine  and has articles published on JancisRobinson 

Feely is a regular speaker on the subject of organic farming and wine. 

The Feelys continue to produce a number of organic, biodynamic and natural wines  recognised for their quality  and cited as a favourite by a famous character of the Dordogne Martin Walker's  'Bruno Chief of Police'. The Feely vineyard is also known for their vineyard share  and harvest weekend covered on RTE (Irish National Broadcaster) Nationwide in November 2009.

Bibliography 

Grape Expectations Publisher: Summersdale (4 Jun 2012) Language: English   (also translated into Polish)
Saving Our Skins Publisher: Summersdale (7 Jul 2014) Language: English 
Wine: The Essential Guide to Tasting, History, Culture and More. Summersdale, 2015 .
Glass Half Full (Publisher: Summersdale (13 April 2017) Language: English

References

External links
"Caro Feely". summersdale.com.
Caro Feely podcast
 

1968 births
Living people
University of KwaZulu-Natal alumni
University of South Africa alumni
University of Johannesburg alumni